Tom Heathcote (born 11 February 1992 in Inverness) is a rugby union player for Scotland and Worcester Warriors in the Aviva Premiership.

Heathcote was born in Inverness whilst his father Gareth, a Nimrod pilot, was stationed at RAF Kinloss. The family returned to England when Heathcote was three, and he has represented England at age group level.

He made his first team debut for Bath against Gloucester on 24 September 2011. He scored his first points against Leicester on 3 October 2011, and claimed his first try against Worcester in the LV= cup.

On 19 November 2012, he was called up to the Scotland squad (being eligible to play for Scotland having been born in Inverness) and made his international debut off the bench in the test against Tonga on 24 November 2012.

At the end of the 2013–14 season it was announced that Heathcote would be ending his contract one-year early and moving to Edinburgh for the 2014–15 season, citing the progression of 'his career and international aspirations.'

It was announced in February 2015 that Heathcote would depart Edinburgh in summer 2015 to join Worcester Warriors. On 16 October 2015 Heathcote scored an injury time drop goal to help Warriors win their first game back in the Premiership, securing a 13–12 win over Northampton.

References

External links
 Bath Profile
 Scotland
 
 

1992 births
Living people
Bath Rugby players
English rugby union players
Rugby union fly-halves
Rugby union players from Inverness
Scotland international rugby union players
Team Bath rugby union players